Local may refer to:

Geography and transportation
 Local (train), a train serving local traffic demand
 Local, Missouri, a community in the United States
 Local government, a form of public administration, usually the lowest tier of administration
 Local news, coverage of events in a local context which would not normally be of interest to those of other localities
 Local union, a locally based trade union organization which forms part of a larger union

Arts, entertainment, and media 
 Local (comics), a limited series comic book by Brian Wood and Ryan Kelly
 Local (novel), a 2001 novel by Jaideep Varma
 Local TV LLC, an American television broadcasting company
 Locast, a non-profit streaming service offering local, over-the-air television
 The Local (film), a 2008 action-drama film
 The Local, English-language news websites in several European countries

Computing 
 .local, a network address component
 Local variable, a variable that is given local scope

Life sciences and health care
 Local anesthesia, any technique to induce the absence of sensation in part of the body
 Local disease (localized disease), disease confined to an area of the body

Mathematics 
 Local class field theory, the study of abelian extensions of local fields
 Local field, a special type of field that is a locally compact topological field with respect to a non-discrete topology
 Local Fields (book), an algebraic number theory textbook by Jean-Pierre Serre
 Local martingale, a type of stochastic process, satisfying the localized version of the martingale property
 Local property, a property which occurs on sufficiently small or arbitrarily small neighborhoods of points
 Local ring, the branch of commutative algebra that studies local rings and their modules
 Local symbol (disambiguation), uses in various subfields of mathematics
 Local zeta-function, a function whose logarithmic derivative is a generating function for the number of solutions of a set of equations defined over a finite field
 Local-global principle, the idea that one can find an integer solution to an equation using the Chinese remainder theorem

Other uses
 Local theory, a physical theory that obeys the principle of locality
 Pub, a drinking establishment, known as a "local" to its regulars
 Local language

See also 
 
 
 Local group (disambiguation)
 Locale (disambiguation)
 Localism (disambiguation)
 Locality (disambiguation)
 Localization (disambiguation)
 Locus (disambiguation)
 Lokal (disambiguation)